Richard Laugs (10 March 1907 in Hagen - 1978 in Mannheim) was a well-known German conductor and pianist.

Laugs was the son of conductor Robert Laugs. He studied in Munich and Berlin under both Joseph Pembaur and Artur Schnabel amongst others. After his academic studies he undertook a concert tour as a pianist and worked as a Répétiteur in Hannover and Berlin.

From 1945 to 1951 Laugs was the first Kapellmeister at the Nationaltheater Mannheim (Nationaltheater Mannheim). He attained a 	university teaching position at the Hochschule für Musik und Darstellende Kunst Mannheim (Mannheim University of Music and Performing Arts) and became its president in 1951. In 1955 he became a professor.

In 2000 his widow and the Mannheimer law professor Claus Meissner created the Beethoven Klavierwettbewerb Richard Laugs (Beethoven piano competition Richard Laugs) in Laugs' memory.

German male conductors (music)
1907 births
1978 deaths
German classical pianists
Male classical pianists
20th-century German conductors (music)
20th-century classical pianists
20th-century German male musicians
Officers Crosses of the Order of Merit of the Federal Republic of Germany